The 36th Infantry Division ("Arrowhead"), also known as the "Panther Division", "Lone Star Division", "The Texas Army", or the "T-patchers", is an infantry division of the United States Army and part of the Texas Army National Guard. It was organized during World War I from units of the Texas and Oklahoma National Guard. As an all-Texas unit, it was called for service for World War II 25 November 1940, was sent to the European Theater of Operations in April 1943, and returned to the Texas Army National Guard in December 1945.

A unit of the 36th Infantry, the 2nd Battalion, 131st Field Artillery, was detached and sent to the Pacific just before the outbreak of war in late 1941. Its members were captured by the Japanese and forced into slave labor. Its fate was unknown for most of the rest of World War II, resulting in it being nicknamed the "Lost Battalion".

The 36th Infantry Division was reconstituted in a May 2004 reorganization of the 49th Armored Division.

The division has been active in search and rescue efforts following natural disasters, as well as supporting the rebuilding of affected areas.

History

World War I

The 36th Division was activated as the 15th Division, an National Guard division from Texas and Oklahoma. The new unit also received a new commander, Major General Edwin St. John Greble. The designation was changed to the 36th Division in July 1917, three months after the American entry into World War I.

The final composition of the 36th Division consisted of the 71st and 72nd Infantry Brigades, the 141st and 142nd Infantry Regiments belonging to the 71st. The 143rd and 144th Infantry Regiments were attached to the 72nd Brigade. Also belonging to the 71st was the 132nd Machine Gun Battalion. Similarly, the 72nd received the 133rd Machine Gun Battalion. The 61st Field Artillery Brigade, 131st, 132nd, and 133rd Field Artillery Regiments, 111th Regiment Engineers, 111th Signal Battalion and the 111th Supply Train comprised the rest of the 36th Division. The unit trained at Camp Bowie, Texas, then in Fort Worth.

After conducting training for the next few months, the 36th was sent to the Western Front in July 1918 and conducted major operations in the Meuse–Argonne offensive. On 9–10 October, the unit participated in heavy combat near the village of St. Etienne. Following this victory, which included the capture of several hundred men and officers of the German Army, as well as artillery, the unit launched an assault near an area known as "Forest Farm." The eventual victory brought World War I to an end. In the relatively brief period of time the 36th Division spent in action during the war, the division suffered 2,584 casualties, 466 of them killed in action and an additional 2,118 wounded or missing.

After spending the next few months in Europe on occupation duties, the 36th Division returned home to the United States where it was deactivated in June 1919.

Order of battle
 Headquarters, 36th Division
 71st Infantry Brigade
 141st Infantry Regiment (2nd Texas Infantry, and 1st Texas Infantry less Machine Gun Company and Band)
 142nd Infantry Regiment (7th Texas Infantry, and 1st Oklahoma Infantry less Machine Gun Company and Band)
 132nd Machine Gun Battalion (Machine Gun Company, 1st Texas Infantry)
 72nd Infantry Brigade
 143rd Infantry Regiment (5th Texas Infantry, and 3rd Texas Infantry less Company D, Machine Gun Company, and Band)
 144th Infantry Regiment (6th Texas Infantry less Company G, and 4th Texas Infantry less Machine Gun Company and Band)
 133rd Machine Gun Battalion (Machine Gun Troop, 1st Texas Cavalry, Company D, 3rd Texas Infantry, and Company G, 6th Texas Infantry)
 61st Field Artillery Brigade
 131st Field Artillery Regiment (75 mm) (2nd Texas Field Artillery)
 132nd Field Artillery Regiment (75 mm) (1st Texas Cavalry less Troops E and K, Machine Gun Troop, and Headquarters Troop)
 133rd Field Artillery Regiment (155 mm) (1st Texas Field Artillery)
 111th Trench Mortar Battery (Troop K and detachment of Troop E, 1st Texas Cavalry)
 131st Machine Gun Battalion (Machine Gun Companies, 3rd and 4th Texas Infantry, and Machine Gun Company, 1st Oklahoma Infantry)
 111th Engineer Regiment (1st Battalion, Texas Engineers, and 1st Battalion, Oklahoma Engineers)
 111th Field Signal Battalion (1st Battalion, Texas Signal Corps)
 Headquarters Troop, 36th Division (Texas Division Headquarters Troop and Headquarters Troop, 1st Texas Cavalry)
 111th Train Headquarters and Military Police (Texas Division Headquarters and Military Police)
 111th Ammunition Train (1st Separate Squadron, Oklahoma Cavalry, and individual transfers)
 111th Supply Train (Individual transfers)
 111th Engineer Train (Transfers from 111th Engineer Regiment)
 111th Sanitary Train (1st and 2nd Texas Ambulance Companies, 1st and 2nd Texas Field Hospitals, 1st Oklahoma Field Hospital)
 141st, 142nd, 143rd, and 144th Ambulance Companies and Field Hospitals

World War II
The 36th Division was called up again for active federal service on 25 November 1940, during World War II (although the United States was neutral at this stage), at San Antonio, Texas, departing for its mobilization station at Camp Bowie, Texas, on 14 December 1940. The division commanded by Major General Claude V. Birkhead, moved to Brownwood, Texas, on 1 June 1941, where it participated in the VIII Corps Brownwood Maneuvers until 13 June 1941. The division then returned to Camp Bowie.

The division then moved to Mansfield, Louisiana, and took part in both the August and September 1941 Louisiana Maneuvers. The division, now commanded by Brigadier General Fred L. Walker, a Regular Army officer from Ohio and a distinguished veteran of World War I, then returned to Camp Bowie on 2 October 1941, where it was reorganized from a square division into a triangular division on 1 February 1942 and redesignated the 36th Infantry Division, just weeks after the American entry into World War II, as a result of the Japanese attack on Pearl Harbor on 7 December 1941, which was followed four days later by the German declaration of war against the United States. As a result of this reorganization, the 144th Infantry, plus numerous supporting units, were transferred out of the division.

The division then moved to Camp Blanding, Florida, on 19 February 1942, and participated in the Carolina Maneuvers between 9 July 1942, and 15 August 1942. The division then was staged at Camp Edwards, Massachusetts, on 17 August 1942, for its port call to the European Theater Of Operations (ETO). During its time at Camp Edwards, the division conducted mock assaults of Martha's Vineyard Island in preparation for future amphibious operations.

The division departed the New York Port of Embarkation (NYPOE) on 2 April 1943, for service in the Mediterranean Theater of Operations (MTO).

Organizations

Pre-2 February 1942 square organization
 Headquarters, 36th Division
 Headquarters, Special Troops, 36th Division
 Headquarters Company, 36th Division
 36th Military Police Company
 36th Signal Company
 111th Ordnance Company (Medium)
 71st Infantry Brigade
 141st Infantry Regiment
 142nd Infantry Regiment
 72nd Infantry Brigade
 143rd Infantry Regiment
 144th Infantry Regiment
 61st Field Artillery Brigade
 131st Field Artillery Regiment (75 mm)
 132nd Field Artillery Regiment (75 mm)
 133rd Field Artillery Regiment (155 mm)
 111th Engineer Regiment
 111th Medical Regiment
 111th Quartermaster Regiment

Post-2 February 1942 triangular reorganization
 Headquarters, 36th Infantry Division
 141st Infantry Regiment
 142nd Infantry Regiment
 143rd Infantry Regiment
 Headquarters and Headquarters Battery, 36th Infantry Division Artillery
 131st Field Artillery Battalion (105 mm)
 132nd Field Artillery Battalion (105 mm)
 133rd Field Artillery Battalion (105 mm)
 155th Field Artillery Battalion (155 mm)
 111th Engineer Combat Battalion
 111th Medical Battalion
 36th Cavalry Reconnaissance Troop (Mechanized)
 Headquarters, Special Troops, 36th Infantry Division
 Headquarters Company, 36th Infantry Division
 736th Ordnance Light Maintenance Company
 36th Quartermaster Company
 36th Signal Company
 Military Police Platoon
 Band
 36th Counterintelligence Corps Detachment

1944–45 augmentations
 191st Tank Battalion (26 August 1944 – 31 August 1944)
 753rd Tank Battalion (15 August 1944 – 26 December 1944); (4 March 1945 – 29 March 1945); (29 April 1945 – 13 June 1945)
 636th Tank Destroyer Battalion (15 August 1944 – 29 March 1945; 29 April 1945 – 13 June 1945)
 822nd Tank Destroyer Battalion (29 April 1945 – 1 May 1945)
 443rd Anti Aircraft Artillery Battalion (AW)(7 December 1944 – 13 January 1945)
 442nd Regimental Combat Team (11 September 1944 – 13 October 1944)

Combat operations

North Africa and Italy 1943−1944
The 36th Division landed in French North Africa on 13 April 1943, and trained at Arzew and Rabat. However, the training was hampered by the need to supply guards for some 25,000 Axis prisoners of war (POWs) who had surrendered at the conclusion of the Tunisian campaign in May. It was assigned to Major General Ernest J. Dawley's VI Corps, part of the Fifth Army, but attached to the Services of Supply, North African Theater of Operations, United States Army (NATOUSA), for supply. The 36th Division was originally intended to take part in the Allied invasion of Sicily, codenamed Operation Husky, but Lieutenant General George S. Patton the Seventh Army commander, preferred to use experienced troops instead and the 36th Division remained in North Africa. The Fifth Army was commanded by Lieutenant General Mark W. Clark, who knew the 36th Division well from his time as chief of staff to Lieutenant General Lesley J. McNair, commander of Army Ground Forces, and specifically chose the 36th Division, rather than the more experienced 34th Infantry Division, together with the British 46th and 56th Infantry Divisions, to spearhead the Allied assault landings at Salerno, Italy, which was given the codename of Operation Avalanche.

The division first saw action, in the Italian campaign, on 9 September 1943. It was the first U.S. combat unit to fight on the European continent when it landed by sea at Paestum and fought in the Battle of Salerno against intense German opposition. The Germans launched numerous fierce counterattacks on 12–14 September, but the 36th, which at one stage during the battle was holding a 35-mile sector of the front (six times more than a full-strength infantry division was able to hold), repulsed them with the aid of air support and naval gunfire, and, with the help of paratroopers of the 504th Parachute Infantry Regiment, advanced slowly, securing the area from Agropoli to Altavilla. After sustaining over 4,000 casualties in its first major action, the division spent the next few weeks behind the lines, where it remained in the Fifth Army reserve, absorbing replacements and training for future combat operations. Despite the heavy losses, the 36th Division was considered to have fought well, and four men were awarded the Medal of Honor.

The 36th Division returned to combat in mid-November, after six weeks of rest, now under Major General Geoffrey Keyes' II Corps command. It captured Mount Maggiore, Mount Lungo, and the village of San Pietro despite strong enemy positions and severe winter weather. This grueling campaign against the Bernhardt Line was marked by futile attempts to establish a secure bridgehead across the Gari River, erroneously identified as the Rapido on 1 January 1944, to 8 February. The division attacked across the Gari River on 20 January but was harshly repulsed by the 15th Panzergrenadier Division. The 141st and 143rd Infantry Regiments were virtually destroyed, and the attack was stopped on 22 January. In 48 hours, the 36th Division had sustained 1,681 casualties, 143 of them killed, 663 wounded, and 875 missing, out of almost 6,000 men who took part. Many of the casualties consisted of newly-arrived replacements who were poorly integrated into their units. German losses were minimal, with only 64 killed and a further 179 wounded. A company commander in the 143rd Infantry said, "I had 184 men. Forty-eight hours later, I had 17. If that's not mass murder, I don't know what is." 36th Division losses until the end of January 1944 was of 2,255 battle casualties and 2,009 non-battle, with the combat effectiveness of the 141st and 143rd Infantry Regiment lost.

Strong controversy flared among the officers of the division. Lieutenant General Clark, the Fifth Army commander, was severely criticized for having ordered a difficult frontal attack, and was accused of having caused the disaster. After the war Congress, urged by veterans of the division, conducted an investigation into the causes and responsibility for the defeat on the Gari River. Clark was absolved of blame and he personally believed the attack to be necessary, in order to attract German reserves from Northern Italy to prevent their use at Anzio, where an amphibious assault, codenamed Operation Shingle, was being launched by Anglo-American forces in an attempt to outflank the Winter Line, capture the Italian capital of Rome and potentially force a German withdrawal away from their formidable Winter Line defenses. However, the German reserves identified in Northern Italy had already been drawn forward onto the front of the British X Corps during the First Battle of Monte Cassino a few days before, thus making the 36th Division's assault unnecessary, although this was unknown to Clark at the time.

After assisting the 34th Infantry Division in the attack on Cassino and fighting defensively along the Gari River, the severely depleted 36th withdrew from the line on 12 March, for rest and recreation. The division arrived by sea at the Anzio beachhead on 22 May, under the command of Major General Lucian Truscott's VI Corps, to take part in Operation Diadem, with the breakout from the beachhead commencing the following day. It drove north to capture Velletri on 1 June, and entered Rome on 5 June 1944, the day before the Normandy landings. Pushing up from Rome, the 36th encountered sharp resistance at Magliano, but reached Piombino on 26 June, before moving back to Paestum for rest and recreation. In July Major General Walker, who had commanded the 36th Division since September 1941, was replaced by Major General John E. Dahlquist.

Western Europe 1944−1945
On 15 August 1944, as part of the U.S. 6th Army Group, the division made another amphibious assault landing, against light opposition in the Saint-Raphaël-Fréjus area of southern France as part of Operation Dragoon, the Allied invasion of Southern France. A rapid advance opened the Rhone River Valley. Montelimar fell, 28 August, and large German units were trapped. On 15 September, the division was attached to the French First Army. The 36th advanced to the Moselle River at Remiremont and the foothills of the Vosges. On 30 September, the 442nd Regimental Combat Team (442nd RCT, a Japanese-American unit) was assigned to the 36th to help shore up the division. The 442nd was subsequently used to spearhead the capture towns of Bruyères and Biffontaine where they faced stiff opposition. On 24 October the 143rd Infantry relieved the 100th and 3rd Battalion who were sent to Belmont, another small town to the north, for some short-lived rest. On 23 October the 1st Battalion, 141st Infantry were cut off just beyond the town or Biffontaine. On 27 October the 442nd RCT was called back in to save this Lost Battalion. On the afternoon of 30 October 3rd Battalion broke through and reached 1st Battalion, 141st, rescuing 211 T-Patchers at the cost of 800 men in five days. However, the fighting continued for the 442nd as they moved past the 141st Infantry. The drive continued until they reached Saint-Die on 17 November when they were finally pulled back. The 100th fielded 1,432 men shortly before, but was now down to 239 infantrymen and 21 officers. The 2nd Battalion was down to 316 riflemen and 17 officers, while not a single company in the 3rd Battalion had over 100 riflemen; the entire 100th/442nd Regimental Combat Team was down to less than 800 soldiers. On 13 October 1944, when attached to the 36th Infantry Division, the unit was at 2,943 rifleman and officers, but in only three weeks 140 were killed and 1,800 were wounded, while 43 were missing. For this action, the 442nd RCT would earn 3 of its 7 Presidential Unit Citations.

In a grinding offensive, the division crossed the Meurthe River, breached the Ste. Marie Pass and burst into the Alsatian Plains. The enemy counterattacked, 13 December 1944, but the 36th held the perimeter of the Colmar Pocket. Two days later, the division was released from attachment to the French First Army, and returned to the control of VI Corps, now under Major General Edward H. Brooks, under the Seventh Army, commanded by Lieutenant General Alexander Patch. The German counterattacks out of the Colmar Pocket were so fierce, that at times, the field artillery was forced to fire over open sights at point blank range to stop them. On 20 December 1944, the division resumed the attack, advancing northward along the Rhine River to Mannheim meeting heavy resistance at Haguenau, Oberhöfen, and Wissembourg. In this action Company "G" of the 143rd Infantry received a Presidential Unit Citation. On 27 December 1944, the division was reassigned to Major General Frank W. Milburn's XXI Corps of the Seventh Army, and was pinched out and returned to Seventh Army reserve on 30 December 1944. 

The division was taken out of the line for the first time since it had landed in the south of France. On 3 January 1945, the division was reassigned to Major General Wade H. Haislip's XV Corps. In January 1945, the division was reassigned to VI Corps. It returned to the line early March. The 36th was reassigned to the Seventh Army on 29 March 1945, and moved to the Danube River on 22 April 1945. The 36th Division has been recognized as a liberating unit for its work securing the subcamps of the Dachau concentration camp system.

The 36th Division was reassigned to the XXI Corps on 27 April 1945, and attacked the Künzelsau area on the 30th. Members of the 36th Division's 142nd Infantry arriving as reinforcements on 5 May tipped the Battle for Castle Itter in favor of a combined U.S. Army/Wehrmacht defense against a Waffen SS attack, the only time German and American forces fought side by side in World War II.

By 8 May 1945, otherwise known as Victory in Europe Day (VE-Day), the 36th Division was based in Kitzbühel, Austria where it captured Generalfeldmarschall- Gerd von Rundstedt, the commander of all German Armed Forces on the Western Front, and its final station was at Kufstein, Austria on 14 August 1945.

After 400 days of combat, the 36th Infantry Division returned to the United States in December 1945. It was returned to the Texas Army National Guard on 15 December 1945.

The Lost Battalions

The 36th ID suffered significant losses during World War II, twice earning the distinction of having "lost" a battalion during the war.

The European "Lost Battalion" refers to the 1st Battalion, 141st Infantry, which was surrounded by German forces in the Vosges Mountains on 24 October 1944.

They would be rescued by the 442nd Regimental Combat Team, a segregated unit composed of second-generation Japanese Americans. In five days of battle, over 800 men of the 442nd gave their lives in order to break through German defenses and rescue 211 survivors of the 141st.

Texas Governor John Connally would make the members of the 442nd honorary Texans in appreciation of their rescue of the 141st Infantry in 1962.

Earmarked as part of the reinforcements to U.S. Army troops in the Philippines, the 2nd Battalion, 131st Field Artillery, was detached from the 36th Infantry and deployed on 21 November 1941 to join in the Pacific War. The 131st took part in the Battle of Java and fought fiercely at Porong with several other Allied units until the battalion was captured by the Japanese in March 1942. Information on the unit's fate was unknown and considered "lost" as details following the Dutch surrender in Java failed to reach the U.S. government.

As prisoners, the men were forced to work in Burma and Thailand on the Burma Railway of The Bridge on the River Kwai fame, as well as coal mines, docks and shipyards in Japan and other southeast Asian countries. Conditions were poor, treatment harsh, and mortality exceptionally high. It was only through debriefing of survivors from Japanese POW convoys who had been sunk and rescued by U.S. submarines in September 1944 that the U.S. government would learn of the unit's fate.

Repatriated after the end of the war in August 1945, the surviving POWs of the lost battalion were scattered throughout Southeast Asia in Java, Singapore, Burma, Thailand, French Indo China, Japan, China and Manchuria.

Unit awards
 Presidential Unit Citation: 12.

Personal awards
 Medal of Honor: 14
 Distinguished Service Crosses: 80
 Distinguished Service Medals: 2
 Silver Stars: 2,354
 Legion of Merit Medals: 49
 Soldier's Medals: 77
 Bronze Star Medals: 5,407
 Air Medals: 88

Casualties
 Total battle casualties: 19,466
 Killed in action: 3,131
 Wounded in action: 13,191
 Missing in action: 494
 Prisoner of war: 2,650

Global War on Terror

On 1 May 2004, the 49th Armored Division of the Texas Army National Guard was officially inactivated and the 49th Armored Division was redesignated the 36th Infantry Division. After half a century, the "Fighting 36th" was reactivated and carried on the legacy of the 36th Division.

In January 2004, 74 soldiers from Alpha Battery (TAB), 2nd Battalion, 131st Field Artillery were activated for federal service in support of Operation Iraqi Freedom. Alpha Battery commanded by CPT Alvaro Gomez entered federal service in Fort Sill, OK. Under the supervision of 1SG Alfredo Barrera, the soldiers trained and deployed to Iraq. While readying their equipment in Kuwait, Alpha Battery was given her mission and the five radar sections were split up. One AN-TPQ37 radar section (SSG Gonzales) was attached to the 1st Marine Division in Al Taqadum another (CW4 Earnest Metcalf) was assigned to the 1st Infantry Division at LSA Anaconda and the three AN-TPQ36 radar sections (CW2 Davidson, CW2 Bien, and SSG Johnson) were assigned to the 2nd Infantry Division in Mosul. The headquarters and support platoon (1LT Christopher Galvan) operated out of Forward Operating Base Freedom in northern Mosul.  In addition to the target acquisition mission, the support platoon supplemented patrols conducted by the 25th Infantry Division Fires Brigade FIST Team and provided security for the FOB's perimeter by manning the entrance gates and watch towers. At the conclusion of the battery's deployment, its members were awarded 3 Bronze Star Medals, 1 Purple Heart Medal, 47 Army Commendation Medals, 74 Combat Action Badges, several memorandums of appreciation from command staff, and authorized to wear the unit shoulder sleeve insignia for wartime service from the 2nd Infantry Division, the 25th Infantry Division, the 36th Infantry Division, or the 1st Infantry Division.

In 2005 approximately 100 soldiers of the 36th Infantry Division deployed to Bosnia for Enduring Mission 3 which was a continuation from previous IFOR and SFOR missions.  When Task Force Strike left Eagle Base in Tuzla late 2006, it marked the end of an American military maneuver presence in Bosnia which had existed for almost a decade after the Dayton Accords.

In 2005, over three thousand troops from the 56th BCT, 36th ID deployed to Iraq. The 3rd Battalion, 133rd Field Artillery Regiment and 2nd Battalion, 142nd Infantry Regiment were both awarded Meritorious Unit Citations for their service in Iraq.

In 2005–06, 800 soldiers of 3d Battalion, 141st Infantry Regiment, 72d Brigade, 36th Infantry Division deployed to Afghanistan. The battalion was attached to the 504th Infantry Regiment of the 82d Airborne Division and earned a Joint Meritorious Unit Citation.

In 2006, the 1st Squadron, 124th Cavalry Regiment, 36th Infantry Division became the first cavalry unit to serve as peacekeepers in the Sinai Desert for the Multinational Force and Observers. The force was made up of soldiers from several units of the 36th Infantry Division including 1–112th AR, 2–112th AR, 3–112th AR, 3rd Mech, and C Btry 2-131 FA (MLRS).

In late 2006, Company B of the 3d Battalion, 144th Infantry Regiment deployed to Iraq after pre-deployment training at Ft. Dix, NJ and were actively engaged in combat operations. They returned in late 2007. 5 Army Commendation Medals with Valor Devices were awarded to soldiers of 1st Platoon, Second Squad in recognition of the defeat of an ambush on a State Department convoy in central Baghdad.

In late 2005 to late 2006, the 36th Infantry Division was the major leading force for KFOR7, the peacekeeping mission on Kosovo.

The Combat Aviation Brigade, 36th Infantry Division shipped to Iraq in September 2006 for a planned one-year deployment.

On 7 May 2007 3d Battalion, 144th Infantry Regiment mobilized as "Task Force Panther" in support of Operation Iraqi Freedom. "Task Force Panther" trained at Camp Shelby, MS, and, after validation, deployed to Kuwait, and then into Iraq.

On 28 August 2008, more than 3000 soldiers of the 56th IBCT again deployed to Iraq. On 15 August 2009, the 3000 soldiers of the 56th IBCT returned to Texas after 10 months in Iraq. Two soldiers from Bravo Troop 3-124 Cav, and one from C Btry 4-133 were wounded during the tour.

On 10 April 2009, 136th Military Police Battalion deployed more than 150 soldiers to Afghanistan to command and run the Bagram Theatre Internment Facility. Task Force Lonestar transferred the detainees from the BTIF to the new detention facility in Parwan. 136th Military Police Battalion returned in May 2010.

On 1 October 2009, the 72nd IBCT mobilized for deployment to Iraq. Upon arrival in theater, the brigade headquarters assumed authority as the Joint Area Support Group-Conditional for the International Zone, with the brigade's subordinate elements distributed throughout the country conducting detainee operations. The brigade returned from Iraq in July and August 2010, with A Battery, 1-133 FA being the last element to return home.

In November and December 2010, the 36th Infantry Division Headquarters deployed to Basrah, Iraq, replacing the US 1st Infantry Division, where they provided command and control of US active Army, Reserve, and National Guard units. The 36th ID command covered 15,000 deployed military and contractor forces at 17 bases in the 9 provinces in southern Iraq. As part of the drawdown of US forces in Iraq, the division headquarters redeployed to the US starting in late August 2011, the main body following in September 2011 to Fort Hood, TX. No 36th ID soldiers were lost to combat operations during the deployment.

On 26 November 2011, the newly formed 1st Battalion (Airborne), 143rd Infantry Regiment mobilized as Task Force Walker for deployment to Afghanistan. The battalion, comprising companies from Texas, Rhode Island, and Alaska, was deployed across the country in support of provincial reconstruction teams. The headquarters element was located in Kabul serving under the 648th Maneuver Enhancement Brigade (Task Force Hydra) in the Kabul base cluster.

In the summer of 2012, both the 136th Maneuver Enhancement Brigade (MEB) and Task Force Arrowhead mobilized for service in Afghanistan. The 136th MEB took control of several bases in the Kabul area, while TF Arrowhead, composed of 31 security force assistance teams (SFATs), performed advisory duties with various Afghan National Security Forces (ANSF) elements in Regional Command-South.

Also in the summer of 2012 the 3rd Battalion, C & D Company 144th Infantry regiment from the 56th BCT deployed to Afghanistan (RC West) as Task Force Bowie. TF Bowie provided Battalion Command Base Security, including but not limited to presences/combat patrols, assessment missions, checkpoint control and flight line security for Shindand Airbase and surrounding areas. Shindand Air Base is located in the western part of Afghanistan in the Herat province, 7 miles northeast of the city of Sabzwar. Other areas of operations included Herat city, as well as RC North. In the fall of 2012 a small detachment was sent to RC North to assist in base security operations in coordination with small regiment from the 3rd ID.

In the spring of 2013 B co 3-144th IN deployed in support of TF 3–10 to Afghanistan and served in Konduz, Kabul, Mazar-e-Sharif Camp Bashton, and BAF

In Afghanistan, 36th has deployed agricultural development teams helping build farming infrastructure, as well as security forces advising teams training Afghan national security forces to promote long-term success of the Afghan government.

The 36th Infantry Division is the first National Guard Division to command an active duty brigade as part of the Army's total force policy. This allows the active and reserve units to train together as they are preparing to fight together.

Currently, the 36th is in charge of an Afghanistan theatre; They will be in charge for 18 months (Two 9-month rotations). This is the first time a National Guard division has been in charge of an Afghanistan theatre this long.

During the Global War on Terror, the 36th ID has been involved in numerous military operations including Operation New Dawn, Enduring Freedom, Freedom's Sentinel, and Jump Start.

In February 2018, Army Times reported the 36th was deployed to Iraq to assist Iraqi forces against Islamic State.

2020–Present

COVID-19 Pandemic 
The 36th Infantry Division assisted alongside other Texas National Guard units were activated to assist with the COVID-19 Pandemic. The 36th Infantry Division assisted with delivering over 7,000 pallets of protective equipment to testing facilities, decontaminating nursing homes, and distributing over 5,900,000 COVID-19 tests.

Civil Disturbance 
More Servicemembers within the 36th Infantry Division assisted in preparation for civil disturbances triggered by the George Floyd protests. The Servicemembers were trained in crowd control tactics, including non-lethal responses and assisting civilian law enforcement agencies.

Unit Deployment on Behalf of Operation Spartan Shield 
Throughout the other events of 2020, over 700 servicemembers of the 36th Infantry Division were Federally Activated and deployed to the United States Central Command for Task Force Spartan, Operation Spartan Shield in September 2020. Activated Soldiers serve in Kuwait, Saudi Arabia, and Jordan. The deployment coincided with Kuwait's 30th Liberation Day, tasking the 36th Infantry Division with maintaining and continuing the United States' partnership and allied strength with Kuwait, culminating in a self-described complex live-fire exercise.

Insignia & Song
An insignia consisting of an olive drab "T" on a light blue flint arrowhead was adopted by the 36th Division in 1918. Light blue is the infantry branch color. The flint arrowhead represents the State of Oklahoma (once the Indian Territory) and the "T", Texas and commonly called the "T-Patch."

The song of the 36th Infantry Division is "The Eyes of World are on you 36th." Partial lyrics are as follow:

Current structure

36th Infantry Division exercises training and readiness oversight of a division headquarters and headquarters battalion, and eight brigade-size formations from the states of Texas, New Mexico and Tennessee. 
  Headquarters and Headquarters Battalion
  56th Infantry Brigade Combat Team (IBCT) (TX ARNG)
  Headquarters and Headquarters Company (HHC)
  1st Squadron, 124th Cavalry Regiment, Reconnaissance Surveillance and Target Acquisition (RSTA)
  2nd Battalion, 142rd Infantry Regiment
  3rd Battalion, 144th Infantry Regiment
 3rd Battalion, 133rd Field Artillery Regiment (FAR)
 156th Brigade Engineer Battalion (BEB)
 949th Brigade Support Battalion (BSB)
  72nd IBCT (TX ARNG)
  HHC
  1st Squadron, 112th Cavalry Regiment (RSTA)
  1st Battalion, 141st Infantry Regiment
  3rd Battalion, 141st Infantry Regiment
 1st Battalion, 133rd FAR
 172nd BEB
 536th BSB
  81st Stryker Brigade Combat Team (WA ARNG)
  278th Armored Cavalry Regiment (TN ARNG) (realigned with 36th ID 10/26/2020)
 Headquarters and Headquarters Troop
 1st Squadron
 2nd Squadron
 3rd Squadron (TX NG) (transferred to the Texas Guard in January, 2021)
 4th Squadron, RSTA
 Field Artillery Squadron
 Engineer Squadron
 Support Squadron
  Combat Aviation Brigade (CAB), 36th Infantry Division (TX NG)
  HHC (TX NG)
  1st Battalion, 114th Aviation Regiment (Service and Support) (AR NG)
  3rd Battalion, 131st Aviation Regiment (Assault) (AL NG)
  1st Battalion, 149th Aviation Regiment (Attack/Recon) (TX NG)
  2nd Battalion, 149th Aviation Regiment (General Support) (TX NG) (Headquarters Grand Prairie, Texas)
  449th Aviation Support Battalion (TX NG)
  36th Sustainment Brigade
372nd Combat Sustainment Support Battalion
111th Medical Battalion
197th Special Troops Support Company (Special Operations)(Airborne)
36th Special Troops Battalion
1936th Contingency Contracting Battalion
  136th Maneuver Enhancement Brigade
625th Signal Company
136th Military Police Battalion
136th Signal Battalion
4th Battalion, 133rd Field Artillery Regiment (HIMARS)
636th Brigade Support Battalion

Former Units
  256th IBCT (LA NG)
 HHC
  2nd Squadron, 108th Cavalry Regiment, RSTA
  2nd Battalion, 156th Infantry Regiment
  3rd Battalion, 156th Infantry Regiment
 1st Battalion, 173rd Infantry Regiment
  1st Battalion, 141st FAR
 769th BEB
 199th BSB

Division commanders

See also
 549th Engineer Light Ponton Company

Notable people
 Raymond S. McLain

References

 DVIDS - News Division-Division Cuts Ribbon on New Intelligence Facility 12-04-2016

External links

 Brigadier General John C. L. Scribner Texas Military Forces Museum
 36th Infantry Division Association
 GlobalSecurity.org: 36th Infantry Division
  The Story of the 36th, the experiences of the 36th in the great War World War I
 The Story of the 36th Infantry Division World War II
 Home page

036th Infantry Division, U.S.
Divisions of the United States Army National Guard
Military units and formations in Texas
Infantry Division, U.S. 036
036th Infantry Division (United States)
Military units and formations established in 1917
Military units and formations disestablished in 1919
Military units and formations established in 1923
Infantry divisions of the United States Army in World War II
Military units and formations disestablished in 1945
Military units and formations established in 2004
Texas Military Forces